Neoniphargus is a genus of freshwater amphipod crustacean. It is the type genus of the family Neoniphargidae. It is found in the Australian states of Victoria and Tasmania and is threatened by climate change due to its restricted distribution.

References 

Neoniphargidae
Freshwater crustaceans of Australia